The 1961 Victorian Trophy was an International motor race staged at the Ballarat Air Strip circuit in Victoria, Australia on 12 February 1961.
Open to Formula Libre cars, it was contested over 33 laps, a distance of approximately 100 miles (161 km).
The race meeting was organised by the Light Car Club of Australia.

The race was won by American driver Dan Gurney in a BRM P48.

Results

References

External links
 Open Wheelers 1961, autopics.com.au

Victorian Trophy
Motorsport in Victoria (Australia)